Sanjay Jaiswal (born 29 November 1965) is an Indian politician who has represented Paschim Champaran constituency of Bihar since 2009 as a member of the Bharatiya Janata Party (BJP), winning the seat in 2009, 2014, and 2019. He is serving as the party president of BJP Bihar unit from September 2019.

Early life 
Jaiswal was born to Madan Prasad Jaiswal (former MP of Bettiah) and Saroj Jaiswal on 29 November 1965 at Betiah, West Champaran, Bihar. He completed his M.B.B.S from Patna Medical College and M.D. from Darbhanga Medical College in Darbhanga.

Career 
While in office, Jaiswal has been a member of Consultative Committee on Ministry of Information and Broadcasting, the Committee on Health and Family Welfare, Committee on Estimates and a member of the governing body JIPMER, Pondicherry.

He is also a member of the Governing Body of AIIMS, Patna and the Central Council of Health and Family Welfare.

Personal life 
He is married to Manju Chaudhary and they have one son and one daughter.

References

External links 

 
 

India MPs 2009–2014
Bharatiya Janata Party politicians from Bihar
Living people
1965 births
Lok Sabha members from Bihar
India MPs 2014–2019
People from West Champaran district
India MPs 2019–present
State Presidents of Bharatiya Janata Party